Sandtorg is a former municipality in Troms county, Norway. The  municipality existed from 1926 until its dissolution in 1964.  The municipality included the southern part of what is now Harstad Municipality on the eastern coast of the island of Hinnøya as well as some smaller islands in the Vågsfjorden.  The administrative centre was actually located in the town of Harstad, immediately north of Sandtorg (although Harstad was not in Sandtorg municipality).  Sandtorg Church, the main church for the municipality was in the village of Sørvika.

History
Since the early 13th century, there has been a trading post at Sandtorgholmen (where the village of Sandtorg is located). This location became more important in the late 18th century when pilot services were added for foreign and local ships.  The trading post continued to be a focal point of Sandtorg until 1945 when the Norwegian Army's communication services took over the facilities after the German occupation (1940–1945).  The army returned Sandtorgholmen to civilian use in the 1990s.  Today, the Sandtorgholmen trading post features a hotel with a harbor restaurant and meeting facilities.

The municipality of Sandtorg was established on 1 July 1926, when the municipality of Trondenes was divided into three separate municipalities.  The areas east of the Tjeldsundet strait and east of the Vågsfjorden (population: 2,443) became the municipality of Skånland and the areas on the west side of the Tjeldsundet and Vågsfjorden were split two ways. The southern part (population: 4,224) became the municipality of Sandtorg and the northern part (population: 3,429) remained as the municipality of Trondenes.

During the 1960s, there were many municipal mergers across Norway due to the work of the Schei Committee.  On 1 January 1964, Trondenes municipality (population: 6,567), Sandtorg municipality (population: 7,512), the town of Harstad (population: 3,808) were merged to form a new, larger Harstad Municipality.

Bjarne Berg-Sæther (born 1919) was a significant leader in Sandtorg during the 20th century. He was the mayor of Sandtorg from 1948 until 1964 when it was merged with Harstad. He was also the first mayor of the newly merged municipality of Harstad, which occurred in 1964 (and therefore also the last mayor of Sandtorg). During his 20 years as mayor after World War II, boat building factories at Rødskjæret were added, lighted ski tracks, and a community cultural house was built. Many of these additions caused Sandtorg's population to almost double.

Name
The municipality is named after the old Sandtorg farm.  The first element comes from the word sandr which means "sandy area" and the second element means "square".  The name was frequently used historically for farms where there was a marketplace.

Government

Municipal council
The municipal council  of Sandtorg was made up of 35 representatives that were elected to four year terms.  The party breakdown of the council was as follows:

See also
List of former municipalities of Norway

References

Harstad
Former municipalities of Norway
1926 establishments in Norway
1964 disestablishments in Norway